International Cruise Terminal is a station on the Shanghai Metro Line 12, which opened 29 December 2013.

Exits
1: Dong Changzhi Road, Shangqiu Road
4: Dong Changzhi Road, Shangqiu Road

Nearby 
 While Magnolia Plaza

See also 
 International Cruise Terminal Station, Mumbai

References

Railway stations in Shanghai
Line 12, Shanghai Metro
Shanghai Metro stations in Hongkou District
Railway stations in China opened in 2013
2013 establishments in China